A Gordie Howe hat trick is a variation on ice hockey's hat-trick. It is accomplished when a player collects a goal, an assist, and a fight in the same game. It is named after Hall of Famer Gordie Howe.

The term was coined by a 1950s New York sportswriter, although Howe himself only accomplished the feat twice in his five-decade career. Howe's son Marty once remarked, "The Gordie Howe hat trick should really be a goal, an assist and a cross-check to the face. That might be more accurate."

Incidents
The first known Gordie Howe hat trick was achieved by Hockey Hall of Fame defenceman Harry Cameron of the Toronto Arenas on December 26, 1917, in a 7–5 win against the Montreal Canadiens.

Howe himself accomplished his first Gordie Howe hat trick on October 11, 1953, when he scored a goal, assisted on Red Kelly's goal, and fought the Toronto Maple Leafs' Fernie Flaman. The second occurrence was on March 21, 1954, once again versus the Maple Leafs. Howe scored the opening goal, assisted on two Ted Lindsay goals, and fought Ted "Teeder" Kennedy.

Multiples
The "Double Gordie", involving two players who each tallied a goal, an assist, and fought each other, has occurred on three occasions:
 On April 9, 1981 Brad Park (who recorded 1G, 3A)  fought Bobby Smith (who recorded 1G, 1A)
 On March 9, 2010, Fedor Tyutin (who recorded 1G, 2A) fought Ryan Getzlaf (who recorded 1G, 1A) 
 On January 10, 2012, Adam Henrique (who recorded 1G, 1A) fought Jarome Iginla (who recorded 1G, 2A)

In the April 9, 1981, playoff game between the Minnesota North Stars and the Boston Bruins where Brad Park and Bobby Smith completed a Double Gordie, Bryan Maxwell also completed a Gordie Howe Hat Trick of his own. The North Stars won the game 9–6.

Debut Variations
A Gordie Howe hat trick that included a player's first NHL goal occurred on November 19, 2014, when Steve Pinizzotto was called up by the Edmonton Oilers and he made his 2014–15 season debut against his previous team, the Vancouver Canucks.

On December 29, 2018, Tyler Lewington of the Washington Capitals, playing in just his second career NHL game, against the Ottawa Senators, became the only player to complete a Gordie Howe hat trick with all three components being NHL career firsts, including his first assist on a goal by Tom Wilson and his first fight against Zack Smith.

Consecutive Days
Doug Risebrough of the Montreal Canadiens became the first NHL player to register a Gordie Howe hat trick on consecutive days, on February 15 and 16, 1975, both games against the Chicago Black Hawks. Jacob Trouba of the New York Rangers became the second to do it on December 7, 2021 against the Blackhawks and the following night against the Colorado Avalanche.

Leaders
Although he played a record 2,421 professional hockey games, Gordie Howe himself only achieved two "Gordie Howe hat tricks" in his NHL career.

The all-time leaders in Gordie Howe hat tricks are Rick Tocchet with 18 and Brendan Shanahan (who would later become the NHL's chief disciplinarian) with 17. Next is Brian Sutter with 16, then Tiger Williams and Wilf Paiement with 15 each.  The active leader is Panthers forward Joe Thornton with five.

References

Hat-trick, Howe
Violence in ice hockey